Glucuronic acid (from Greek γλεῦκος "wine, must" and οὖρον "urine") is a uronic acid that was first isolated from urine (hence the name). It is found in many gums such as gum arabic ( 18%), xanthan, and kombucha tea and is important for the metabolism of microorganisms, plants and animals.

Properties 

Glucuronic acid is a sugar acid derived from glucose, with its sixth carbon atom oxidized to a carboxylic acid. In living beings, this primary oxidation occurs with UDP-α-D-glucose (UDPG), not with the free sugar.

Glucuronic acid, like its precursor glucose, can exist as a linear (carboxo-)aldohexose (<1%), or as a cyclic hemiacetal (furanose or pyranose). Aldohexoses such as D-glucose are capable of forming two furanose forms (α and β) and two pyranose forms (α and β). By the Fischer convention, glucuronic acid has two stereoisomers (enantiomers), D- and L-glucuronic acid, depending on its configuration at C-5. Most physiological sugars are of the D-configuration. Due to ring closure, cyclic sugars have another asymmetric carbon atom (C-1), resulting in two more stereoisomers, named anomers. Depending on the configuration at C-1, there are two anomers of glucuronic acid, α- and β-form. In β-D-glucuronic acid the C-1 hydroxy group is on the same side of the pyranose ring as the carboxyl group. In the free sugar acid, the β-form is prevalent (~64%), whereas in the organism, the α-form UDP-α-D-glucuronic acid (UDPGA) predominates.

Carbohydrate stereoisomers, which differ in configuration at only one (other) asymmetric C-atom, are named epimers. For example, D-mannuronic (C-2), D-alluronic (C-3), D-galacturonic (C-4), and L-iduronic acid (C-5) are epimers of glucuronic acid.

The nonplanar pyranose rings can assume either chair (in 2 variants) or boat conformation. The preferred conformation depends on spatial interference or other interactions of the substituents. The pyranose form of D-glucose and its derivative D-glucuronic acid prefer the chair 4C1.

Additional oxidation at C-1 to the carboxyl level yields the dicarboxylic glucaric acid. Glucuronolactone is the self-ester (lactone) of glucuronic acid.

Direct oxidation of an aldose affects the aldehyde group first. A laboratory synthesis of a uronic acid from an aldose requires protecting the aldehyde and hydroxy groups from oxidation, for example by conversion to cyclic acetals (e. g., acetonides).

Sodium glucuronate can be produced by the direct oxidation of starch with concentrated nitric acid. In this preparation the low availability of water keeps the starch polymers from hydrolyzing and only oxidizes the free hydroxyls, in much the same way that nitrogen dioxide would oxidize the starch. Once this reaction is complete, and the starch/nitric acid mix turns clear (after giving off nitrogen dioxide gas), the solution can be diluted, and hydrolyzed with another mineral acid. Then the oxidation is slowly quenched with sodium hydroxide (or sodium bicarbonate), forming sodium glucuronate, which can be crystallized out of solution. With transition metals, it forms complexes such as iron(III) glucuronate, iron(II) glucuronate, and copper(II) glucuronate.

Functions

Proteoglycans 
Glucuronic acid is a common building block of proteoglycans and glycoglycerolipids:
 Heparin is an inhibitor of blood coagulation, and occurs in mast cells, lung and liver.
 Chondroitin sulfate is found in large quantities in cartilage, aorta, connective tissue, bone, and skin.
 Dermatan sulfate is a proteoglycan in skin, heart, and blood vessels.
 Keratan sulfate is found in the cornea, cartilage, and bone.
 Hyaluronic acid occurs in large quantities in connective tissues, skin, cartilage, and synovial fluid.
 Glycoglycerolipids of glucuronic or galacturonic acids form the cell walls of bacteria.

Glucuronidation 

UDP-α-D-glucuronic acid (UDPGA) is often involved in the phase II metabolism (conjugation) of lipophilic xeno- and endobiotics. These linkages involve glycosidic bonds with thiol, amine and hydroxy groups, or esterification with the carboxyl and hydroxyl groups. This linkage process is known as glucuronidation (or glucuronide conjugation). Glucuronidation occurs mainly in the liver, although the enzymes responsible for its catalysis, UDP-glucuronyltransferases (UDP-GT), have been found in all major body organs, e.g., intestine, kidneys, brain, adrenal gland, spleen, and thymus. Analogous reactions occur with other UDP-uronic acids (e. g., D-galacturonic acid).

Glycosides resulting from glucuronidation are named β-D-glucuronides, its salts and esters are named glucuronates. The human body uses glucuronidation to make alcohols, phenols, carboxylic acids, mercaptans, primary and secondary aliphatic amines, and carbamates more water-soluble, and, in this way, allows for their subsequent elimination from the body through urine or faeces (via bile from the liver) at a significantly increased rate. The carboxyl group is ionized at physiological pH, making the conjugated compound water-soluble. Compounds with molecular masses > 60,000 are too large for renal excretion and will be excreted with bile into the intestine. Neonates are deficient in this conjugating system, making them particularly vulnerable to drugs such as chloramphenicol, which is inactivated by the addition of glucuronic acid, resulting in gray baby syndrome. Bilirubin is excreted in the bile as bilirubin diglucuronide (80%), bilirubin glucuronide (20%), and unconjugated bilirubin (< 1%). In the Crigler–Najjar syndrome and the Gilbert syndrome, UDPGT activity is reduced or nearly absent due to mutations, resulting in jaundice.

It is possible to exhaust the body's supply of glucuronic acid by combining multiple drugs/substances whose metabolism and excretion are primarily or entirely dependent on glucuronidation. Although most such substances have secondary metabolic routes which become prominent following GCA depletion, the rate of metabolism is reduced enough to produce a marked accumulation of all GCA substrates in the system; this often increases drug concentrations in the blood by medically relevant amounts. In the most severe cases permanent and debilitating organ damage (particularly the liver, kidneys, heart, and brain), and even death, have been known to occur. Ethanol, morphine, paracetamol (acetaminophen), cyclooxygenase inhibitors (NSAIDs), endogenous steroids, and certain benzodiazepines are all capable of contributing to GCA depletion, with ethanol and acetaminophen being the most commonly implicated substances involved in cases of accidental overdoses which have been positively attributed to glucuronic acid depletion.

Excessive quantities of GCA can also be hazardous to health, tobacco smoke, most barbiturates, and some carbamates are known to actually stimulate GCA production. Increased GCA activity results in a decrease of the concentration and metabolic half-life of glucuronic acid substrates, causing the plasma levels of glucuronidated drugs to fall below their therapeutic threshold. Excessive glucuronidation of the substrates may result in an inadequate response to traditional doses of affected medications and, unless the drug has a very wide therapeutic index, will generally result in the acute failure of the pharmacotherapy and necessitate the transition of one or more implicated drugs to an equivalent regimen of non-glucuronidated alternatives. A select number of antidepressants and a wide range of anti-psychotic agents are glucuronidation ligands but due to their delayed mechanism of action and pharmacokinetic properties the decrease of their plasma concentrations may not be immediately apparent and tends to present as a sudden and intense relapse of symptoms instead of a gradual regression to the behaviors and thought patterns exhibited by the patient prior to the initiation of their pharmacological treatment.

Glucuronides may be hydrolyzed by β-glucuronidase present in intestinal microflora to the respective aglycone, which may be reabsorbed from the intestine and translocated back to the liver with the blood. The resulting cycle is called enterohepatic circulation. Compounds that undergo enterohepatic circulation are only slowly excreted and usually have a longer half-life in the body.

Certain glucuronides are electrophilic and may function in toxication processes. Covalent binding of the aglycone portions of several carboxylic acid (ester) glucuronides is known to occur to nucleophilic sites on serum albumin via transacylation reactions, for example.

Phenols, quantitatively important P450-derived metabolites of aromatic hydrocarbons, are substrates for both UDP-GT and sulfotransferases. Glucuronides predominate with phenol or a phenol precursor (benzene) in mammals because sulfate formation is a high-affinity, low-capacity system (due to sulfate depletion), whereas glucuronidation is a low-affinity, high-capacity (although still exhaustible) system.

Role in disease
Glucuronic acid, as well as the glucuronidated metabolite of ethanol, ethyl glucuronide (ETG), act on toll-like receptor 4 to aggravate both acute and chronic inflammatory conditions as well as increasing the perceived severity of pain in patients with chronic pain conditions, via up-regulation of the production and release of endogenous inflammatory signaling molecules within the body. Long-term agonism of the TLR4 receptor (such as that which occurs from GCA, ETG, and opiates) results in chronically painful conditions being perceived as considerably more severe than they did previously while pre-existing tolerable yet occasionally painful activities can become more painful than before and will begin to be aggravated by briefer and less physically demanding activities. It can also cause equally painful responses to decreasingly noxious (irritating) stimuli, eventually resulting in considerable agony from stimuli which wouldn't cause any amount of pain to most individuals.

Use 
Determination of urinary steroids and of steroid conjugates in blood. Ethyl glucuronide and ethyl sulfate are excreted in urine as metabolites of ethanol and are used to monitor alcohol use or dependence.

Glucuronic acid and gluconic acid are fermentation products in Kombucha tea.

Glucuronic acid is a precursor of ascorbic acid (vitamin C, formerly called L-hexuronic acid). Ascorbate can be biosynthesized by higher plants, algae, yeast and most animals. An adult goat produces ~13 g of vitamin C per day. This ability is lacking in some mammals (including humans and guinea pigs) and also in insects, invertebrates and most fishes. These species require external ascorbate supply, because they lack the biosynthetic enzyme L-gulonolactone oxidase.

The glucuronide 4-methylumbelliferyl-β-D-glucuronide (MUG) is used to test for the presence of Escherichia coli. E. coli produces the enzyme β-glucuronidase, which hydrolyzes the MUG molecule to a fluorescent product that is detectable under ultraviolet light.

See also 
 Gluconic acid
 Isosaccharinic acid
 Uronic acid

References 

Hepatology
Uronic acids
Vicinal diols